Titanacris is a genus of grasshoppers in the subfamily Romaleinae and tribe Tropidacrini.  Species are recorded from central and southern America: typically living in the canopy of tropical forests.

Species
The Orthoptera Species File lists:
 Titanacris albipes (De Geer, 1773) - type species (as Acrydium albipes De Geer, by subsequent designation)
 Titanacris gloriosa (Hebard, 1924)
 Titanacris humboldtii (Scudder, 1869)
 Titanacris olfersii (Burmeister, 1838)
 Titanacris ornatifemur Descamps & Carbonell, 1985
 Titanacris picticrus (Descamps, 1978)
 Titanacris velazquezii (Nieto, 1857)

References

External Links 
 
 

Caelifera genera
Romaleidae